Mohab Yasser Abdalatif (born 7 June 2002) is an Egyptian basketball player for Zamalek of the Basketball Africa League (BAL), as well as for the Egypt national basketball team.

Early life
Born in Cairo, Yasser went on to play in the NBA Academy Africa in Saly, Senegal. He also appeared at Basketball Without Borders camps.

Professional career
Abdalatif was on the Zamalek roster for the 2020–21 season. He was on the Zamalek roster for the 2021 BAL season and was the youngest player to play in the inaugural season of the league at age 18. He was also the first prospect from an NBA Academy to play in the BAL. Yasser started in all games and won the first-ever BAL championship with his team, averaging 9 points over six games.

In the same season, the 2020–21 season, Yasser won his first Egyptian Basketball Super League title with Zamalek, after helping defeating Al Ittihad in the finals. In the deciding Game 5, Yasser added 17 points to the 84–80 overtime win. After the season, he was named the league's Best Young Player.

On 9 May 2022, Yasser returned to Zamalek and signed a 4-year contract after his one year playing college basketball with East Tennessee State.

College career
On 10 June 2021, Yasser was officially announced as a player for the East Tennessee State Buccaneers starting from the 2021–22 season. As a true freshman at ETSU, Yasser played in all 32 games for the Buccaneers. He averaged 7.2 points and 3.8 rebounds per game. Yasser was also named to the 2021–22 SoCon All-freshman team.

National team career
Yasser played in the 2020 FIBA U18 African Championship with the Egyptian under-18 team. He led the tournament in scoring with 27.6 points per game, and was named to the All-Star Five of the tournament.

In June 2021, Yasser was selected for the Egyptian senior team for the first time by head coach Ahmed Marei.

Career statistics

BAL

|-
|style="text-align:left;background:#afe6ba;"|2021†
|style="text-align:left;"|Zamalek
| 6 || 6 || 20.8 || style="background:#cfecec;"| .697* || .286 || .600 || 3.5 || 1.7|| 1.0 || .0 || 9.0
|-
|style="text-align:left;"|2022
|style="text-align:left;"|Zamalek
| 3 || 0 || 16.7 || .529 || .167 || .500 || 2.3 || 1.0 || 0.7 || .0 || 7.0

College

|-
| align=left|2021–22 
| align=left|  East Tennessee State 
| 32 || 1 || 22.1 || .503 || .319 || .745 || 3.8 || 0.8 || 0.6 || 0.3 || 7.2
|-
|}

Personal life
Yasser is the son of a former Egyptian national team player.

References

External links
Mohab Yasser at RealGM
 East Tennessee State Buccaneers bio

2002 births
Living people
East Tennessee State Buccaneers men's basketball players
Egyptian men's basketball players
Point guards
Shooting guards
Sportspeople from Cairo
Zamalek SC basketball players